Midlothian and Peebles Northern was a county constituency represented in the House of Commons of the Parliament of the United Kingdom from 1918 until 1950. Along with Peebles and Southern, it was formed by dividing the old Midlothian constituency.

Boundaries 
From 1918 the constituency consisted of "The Calder and Suburban County Districts, the burgh of Dalkeith, and that part of the Lasswade County District which is included in the extra-burghal portions of the parishes of Dalkeith and Inveresk."

Members of Parliament

Election results

Elections in the 1910s

Elections in the 1920s

Elections in the 1930s

Elections in the 1940s

References 

Historic parliamentary constituencies in Scotland (Westminster)
Constituencies of the Parliament of the United Kingdom established in 1918
Constituencies of the Parliament of the United Kingdom disestablished in 1950